Tazehnab-e Vosta (also Romanized as Tāzehnāb-e Vosţá) is a village in Shaban Rural District, in the Central District of Nahavand County, Hamadan Province, Iran. At the 2006 census, its population was 235, in 61 families.

References 

Populated places in Nahavand County